Dayuan (or Tayuan; ; Middle Chinese dâiC-jwɐn < LHC: dɑh-ʔyɑn) is the Chinese exonym for a country that existed in Ferghana valley in Central Asia, described in the Chinese historical works of Records of the Grand Historian and the Book of Han. It is mentioned in the accounts of the Chinese explorer Zhang Qian in 130 BCE and the numerous embassies that followed him into Central Asia. The country of Dayuan is generally accepted as relating to the Ferghana Valley, controlled by the Hellenistic polis Alexandria Eschate (modern Khujand, Tajikistan), which can probably be understood as "Greco-Fergana city-state" in English language.

These Chinese accounts describe the "Dayuan" as urbanized dwellers with Caucasian features, living in walled cities and having "customs identical to those of the Daxia" or Greco-Bactrians, a Hellenistic kingdom that was ruling Bactria at that time in today's northern Afghanistan. The Dayuan are also described as manufacturers and great lovers of wine.

The Dayuan were the descendants of Greeks forcibly resettled in the area by the Persian Empire, as well as the subsequent Greek colonists that were settled by Alexander the Great in Ferghana in 329 BCE (see Alexandria Eschate), and had prospered within the Hellenistic realm of the Seleucids and Greco-Bactrians, until they were isolated by the migrations of the Yuezhi around 160 BCE and the Scythians in 140. It appears that the name "Yuan" was simply a transliteration of Sanskrit Yavana or Pali Yona, used throughout antiquity in Asia to designate Greeks ("Ionians"), so that Dayuan would mean "Great Ionians" or "Great Greeks".

By 100 BC, the Dayuan were defeated by the Han dynasty in the Han-Dayuan war. The interaction between the Dayuan and the Chinese is historically crucial, since it represents one of the first major contacts between an urbanized civilization in Central Asia and the Chinese civilization, opening the way to the formation of the Silk Road that was to link the East and the West in material and cultural exchange from the 1st century BCE to the 15th century.

History

Persia
This region was ruled over by Persia starting with Xerxes I, and began to be populated by Greeks starting at this time. When Greeks in other parts of the Persian empire rebelled or otherwise were troublesome, they would be exiled to Sogdia in the far northeast of the Persian empire, the most distant segment from their homelands. The largest city in this northeastern outpost of the Persian empire was known to the Greeks as Cyropolis, after the Persian emperor Cyrus the Great. By the time of the fall of Persia to Alexander the Great, Greek villages, language, and culture were therefore all common in this area.

Hellenistic rule (329–160 BCE)

The region of Ferghana was conquered by Alexander the Great in 329 BCE and became his most advanced base in Central Asia. He founded (probably by occupying and renaming Cyropolis) the fortified city of Alexandria Eschate (Lit. "Alexandria the Furthest") in the southwestern part of the Ferghana valley, on the southern bank of the river Syr Darya (ancient Jaxartes), at the location of the modern city of Khujand (also called Khozdent, formerly Leninabad), in the state of Tajikistan. Alexander built a 6 kilometer long brick wall around the city and, as similarly in the cases of the other cities he founded, had a garrison of his retired veterans and wounded settle there.

The whole of Bactria, Transoxiana and the area of Ferghana remained under the control of the Hellenistic Seleucid Empire until 250 BCE.  The region then wrested independence under the leadership of its Greek governors Diodotus of Bactria, to become the Greco-Bactrian Kingdom.

Greco-Bactrian kingdom (250–160 BCE)

The Greco-Bactrians held their territory, and according to the Greek historian Strabo even went beyond Alexandria Eschate and "extended their empire as far as the Serica and the Phryni" (Strabo XI.XI.I). There are indications that they may have led expeditions as far as Kashgar in Xinjiang, leading to the first known contacts between China and the West around 200 BC. Various statuettes and representations of Greek soldiers have been found north of the Tien Shan, and are today on display in the museum of Urumqi (Boardman).

Around 160 BC, the area of Ferghana seems to have been invaded by Saka tribes (called the Sai-Wang by the Chinese). The Sai-Wang, originally settled in the Ili valley in the general area of Lake Issyk Kul, were retreating southward after having been dislodged by Yuezhi (who themselves were fleeing from the Xiongnu):

The Sakas occupied the Greek territory of Dayuan, benefiting from the fact that the Greco-Bactrians were fully occupied with conflicts in India against the Indo-Greeks, and could hardly defend their northern provinces. According to W. W. Tarn,

Saka rule

The Saka rule of Dayuan possibly started in 160 BC.  When the Chinese explorer Zhang Qian described Dayuan around 128 BCE, he mentioned, besides the flourishing urbanized civilization, there were warriors "shooting arrows on horseback", a probable description of nomadic horse archers that were typical of the steppe civilizations at the time, of which Saka was one.  Dayuan had probably by then become a kingdom of militaristic Saka ruling class exacting taxes and tributes from the local Hellenistic population.

Also in 106–101 BCE, during their conflict with China, the country of Dayuan is said to have been an ally with the neighbouring tribes of Kangju (probably Sodgia). The Chinese also record the name of the king of Dayuan as "Mu-Kua", a Saka name rendered in Greek as Mauakes or Maues. Another Scythian ruler by the name of Maues was later a ruler of the Indo-Scythian kingdom in northern India, during the 1st century BCE.

Yuezhi migration
According to the Han Chronicles In 132BCE the Yuezhi were driven out of the Ili River valley by the Wusun. They fled south from the Ili river area, by-passed the urban civilization of the Dayuan in Ferghana, and re-settled north of the Oxus in Bactria, definitively cutting Dayuan from contact with the Greco-Bactrian kingdom. The Yuezhi would further expand southward into Bactria proper around 125 BCE, and then going on to form the Kushan Empire in the 1st century CE.

Han Chinese rule and interaction
The Dayuan remained a healthy and powerful civilization which had numerous contacts and exchanges with China from 130 BCE.

Zhang Qian's Report

Around 130 BCE, at the time of Zhang Qian's embassy to Central Asia, the Dayuan were described as inhabitants of a region corresponding to the Ferghana, far to the west of the Chinese empire.

To their south-west were the territories of the Yuezhi, with the Greco-Bactrians further south still, beyond the Oxus.

The Shiji then explains that the Yuezhi originally inhabited the Hexi Corridor, before they were defeated by the Xiongnu under Mao-tun and later his son in 176 BCE, forcing them to go beyond the territory of the Dayuan and resettle in the West by the banks of the Oxus, between the territory of the Dayuan and Bactria to the south.

Urbanized city-dwellers
The customs of the Dayuan are said by Zhang Qian to be identical to those of the Bactrians in the south, who actually formed the Greco-Bactrian Kingdom at that time.

They are described as town-dwellers, as opposed to other populations such as the Yuezhi, the Wusun or the Xiongnu who were nomads.

Appearance and Culture
The Shiji comments on the appearance and the culture of the people around Dayuan:

Although the states from Dayuan west to Anxi speak rather different languages, their customs are generally similar and their languages mutually intelligible. The men all have deep-set eyes and profuse beards  and whiskers. They are skillful at commerce and will haggle over a fraction of a cent. Women are held in great respect, and the men make decisions on the advice of their women.

They were great manufacturers and lovers of wine:

According to the Shiji, grapes and alfalfa were introduced to China from Dayuan following Zhang Qian's embassy:

The regions around Dayuan make wine out of grapes, the wealthier inhabitants keeping as much as 10,000 or more piculs stored away. It can be kept for as long as twenty or thirty years without spoiling. The people love their wine and the horses love their alfalfa. The Han envoys brought back grape and alfalfa seeds to China and the emperor for the first time tried growing these plants in areas of rich soil. Later, when the Han acquired large numbers of the "heavenly horses" and the envoys from foreign states began to arrive with their retinues, the lands on all sides of the emperor's summer palaces and pleasure towers were planted with grapes and alfalfa for as far as the eye could see.

The Shiji also claims that metal casting was introduced to the Dayuan region by Han deserters:

... the casting of coins and vessels was formerly unknown. Later, however, when some of the Chinese soldiers attached to the Han embassies ran away and surrendered to the people of the area, they taught them how to cast metal and manufacture weapons.

Han-Dayuan war

Following the reports of Zhang Qian (who was originally sent to obtain an alliance with the Yuezhi against the Xiongnu, in vain), the Chinese emperor Wudi became interested in developing commercial relationships with the sophisticated urban civilizations of Ferghana, Bactria and Parthia: "The Son of Heaven on hearing all this reasoned thus: Ferghana (Dayuan) and the possessions of Bactria and Parthia are large countries, full of rare things, with a population living in fixed abodes and given to occupations somewhat identical with those of the Chinese people, but with weak armies, and placing great value on the rich produce of China" (Shiji, 123)

The Chinese subsequently sent numerous embassies, around ten every year, to these countries and as far as Seleucid Syria."Thus more embassies were dispatched to An-si (Parthia), An-ts'ai (the Aorsi, or Alans), Li-kan (Syria under the Seleucids), T'iau-chi (Chaldea), and Shon-tu (India)... As a rule, rather more than ten such missions went forward in the course of a year, and at the least five or six." (Shiji, 123)

The Chinese were also strongly attracted by the tall and powerful horses ("heavenly horses") in the possession of the Dayuan, which were of capital importance to fight the nomadic Xiongnu. The refusal of the Dayuan to offer them enough horses along with a series of conflicts and mutual disrespect resulted in the death of the Chinese ambassador and the confiscation of the gold sent as payment for the horses.

Enraged, and thinking Dayuan weak, the Chinese Emperor in 104 BCE sent out Li Guangli, the brother of his favorite concubine. He was given 6,000 horsemen and '30,000 young men of bad reputation rounded up from the provinces'. General Li lost many men along the way in petty fights with local rulers. After a severe defeat at a place called Yucheng Li concluded that he was not strong enough to take the enemy capital and therefore returned to Dunhuang (about 102 BC).

Emperor Wudi responded by giving Li Guangli a much larger army along with a huge number of oxen, donkeys and camels to carry supplies. With this force he had no difficulty reaching Ershi, the Dayuan capital. After a 40-day siege the Chinese had broken through the outer wall and cut off the water supply. The nobles of Ershi killed their king and sent his head to Li Guangli, offering the Chinese all the horses they wanted. Li accepted the offer, appointed one of the nobles to be the new king and withdrew with the horses. On his return journey all the petty states accepted Chinese sovereignty. He reached the Jade Gate about 100 BC with 10,000 men and 1,000 horses.

Contacts with the West were re-established following the peace treaty with the Yuan. Ambassadors were once again sent to the West, caravans were sent to Bactria.

Era of East-West trade and cultural exchange
The Silk Road essentially came into being from the 1st century BCE, following the efforts of China to consolidate a road to the Western world, both through direct settlements in the area of the Tarim Basin and diplomatic relations with  Dayuan, Parthians and Bactrians further west.

Intense trade followed soon, confirmed by the Roman craze for Chinese silk (supplied by the Parthians) from the 1st century BC, to the point that the Senate issued, in vain, several edicts to prohibit the wearing of silk, on economic and moral grounds. This is attested by at least three significant authors:
 Strabo (64/ 63 BCE–c. 24 CE).
 Seneca the Younger (c. 3 BCE–65 CE).
 Pliny the Elder (23–79 CE).

This is also the time when the Buddhist faith and the Greco-Buddhist culture started to travel along the Silk Road, entering China from around the 1st century BCE.

See also
 History of Buddhism
 Greco-Buddhism

Footnotes

References

 Sima Qian, Records of the Grand Historian of China. Translated from the Shih Chi of Sima Qian by Burton Watson. New York: Columbia University Press, 1961, Volume II, 
 "Zhang Qian's Mission to the West", translation by Friedrich Hirth published in the Journal of the American Oriental Society, 37/2 (1917), pp. 93–116, adaptation by J. Moore, Department of History, Austin College.
 Han Shu, as translated by A. Wylie in the Journal of the Anthropological Institute of Great Britain and Ireland, Vols. III (1874), pp. 401–452, V (1876), pp. 41–80, and X (1881), pp. 20–73, and XI (1882), pp. 83–115, adaptation by J. Moore, Department of History, Austin College.
 The diffusion of Classical art in Antiquity, John Boardman, Princeton University Press, 1993 
 The Greeks in Bactria and India, W. W. Tarn, Cambridge University Press

External links 
 ShiJi 123: The Account of DaYuan 
 Selection from the Han narrative stories
 See references to Dayuan/Ferghana in the annotated translations by John Hill from the 2nd century Hou Hanshu:  and of the 3rd century Weilüe: http://depts.washington.edu/silkroad/texts/weilue/weilue.html

Historical Chinese exonyms
History of the foreign relations of China
Hellenistic states
Sites along the Silk Road
Bactrian and Indian Hellenistic colonies